The 1945 All-Big Ten Conference football team consists of American football players selected to the All-Big Ten Conference teams selected by the Associated Press (AP) and United Press (UP) for the 1945 Big Ten Conference football season. The UP released the point total for each player in its polling; each player's UP point total is listed below.

All Big-Ten selections

Ends
 Max Morris, Northwestern (AP-1; UP-1 [80 points])
 Ted Kluszewski, Indiana (AP-1; UP-1 [60 points])
 Bob Ravensburg, Indiana (UP-2 [50 points])
 Bob Carley, Minnesota (UP-2 [20 points])

Tackles
 Russ Thomas, Ohio State (AP-1; UP-1 [60 points])
 Clarence Esser, Wisconsin (AP-1; UP-2 [35 points])
 Tom Hughes, Purdue (UP-1 [40 points])
 John Goldsberry, Indiana (UP-2 [15 points])

Guards
 Warren Amling, Ohio State (AP-1; UP-1 [85 points])
 Jim Lecture, Northwestern (AP-1; UP-1 [40 points])
 Les Bingaman, Illinois (UP-2 [35 points])
 Paul Schuetz, Northwestern (UP-2 [25 points])

Centers
 Harold Watts, Michigan (AP-1; UP-1 [60 points])
 Dick Van Dusen, Minnesota (UP-2 [15 points])

Quarterbacks
 Pete Pihos, Indiana (AP-1; UP-1 [50 points])
 Joe Ponsetto, Michigan (UP-2 [35 points])

Halfbacks
 George Taliaferro, Indiana (AP-1; UP-1 [55 points])
 Ed Cody, Purdue (AP-1; UP-1 [60 points])
 Dick Connors, Northwestern (UP-2 [40 points])
 Bob DeMoss, Purdue (UP-2 [35 points])

Fullbacks
 Ollie Cline, Ohio State (AP-1; UP-1 [80 points])
 Dick Fisher, Ohio State (UP-2 [50 points])

Key

AP = Associated Press

UP = United Press

Bold = Consensus first-team selection of both the AP and UPI

See also
1945 College Football All-America Team

References

1945 Big Ten Conference football season
All-Big Ten Conference football teams